Ten Thousand a-Year is a novel written by English barrister Samuel Warren.  First published in 1841, it enjoyed widespread popularity in the United States and Europe for much of the century.

Background
When first published, the novel was split into three volumes for its United Kingdom release and six volumes for release in the United States.  Despite Edgar Allan Poe's critical panning of the book as 'shamefully ill-written' in the November 1841 issue of Graham's Magazine, it went on to become one of the most popular novels of the era in both the United States and Europe.  New print runs and updated editions were published regularly to the turn of the century.

The story chronicles events in the life of its iconic protagonist Tittlebat Titmouse and offers in-depth detail of English common law of the time.

Ten Thousand A Year was, in fact, first published in the Edinburgh Magazine in installments in 1839. The first installment appearing in October of that year at page 505 of No. CCLXXXVIII.

Characters
It has been said that the characters from the novel listed in the first column of the table below represent the real persons listed in the second column of that table.

References

External links 
Ten Thousand a-Year at Project Gutenberg
Digitized Ten Thousand a-Year at Google Books

1841 British novels
William Blackwood books